Philotheca brucei is a species of flowering plant in the family Rutaceae and is endemic to Western Australia. It is a shrub with cylindrical leaves grooved along the top and in spring, white to pink or mauve flowers with five egg-shaped petals.

Description

Taxonomy and naming
This species was first formally described in 1869 by Ferdinand von Mueller who gave it the name Eriostemon brucei and published the description in Fragmenta phytographiae Australiae. The specific epithet (brucei) honours John Bruce who was for a time the acting governor of Western Australia.

In 1970 Paul Wilson described three subspecies, brevifolia, brucei and cinerea. The descriptions were published in the journal Nuytsia. In 1990, Wilson transferred Eriostemon brucei to the genus Philotheca as P. brucei. He also transferred the three subspecies to Philotheca and the names have been accepted by the Australian Plant Census:
 Philotheca brucei subsp. brevifolia (Paul G.Wilson) Paul G.Wilson has densely hairy leaves that are only up to long;
 Philotheca brucei (F.Muell.) Paul G.Wilson subsp. brucei has more or less cylindrical leaves that are glabrous when mature;
 Philotheca brucei subsp. cinerea (Paul G.Wilson) Paul G.Wilson. has densley hairy, oblong leaves.

Distribution and habitat
Subspecies brevifolia grows on rocky hills between Paynes Find and Sandstone. Subspecies brucei grows on rocky hills and breakaways within  of the west coast of Western Australia. Subspecies cinerea grows on laterite breakaways near the upper Murchison River.

Conservation status
All three subspecies of Philotheca brucei are classified as "not threatened" by the Western Australian Government Department of Parks and Wildlife.

References

brucei
Flora of Western Australia
Sapindales of Australia
Plants described in 1869
Taxa named by Ferdinand von Mueller